Freedom Square or Liberty Square is located in the center of Tbilisi, Georgia, at the eastern end of Rustaveli Avenue. (In Georgian, it is თავისუფლების მოედანი Tavisuplebis moedani, pronounced ). 

Under Imperial Russia it was known as Erivansky or Paskevich-Erivansky Square (Georgian: ერევანსკის მოედანი, Erevansk'is moedani, Russian: Эриванская площадь, Erivanskaya ploshchad.) While part of the Soviet Union, it was Beria Square (Georgian: ბერიას მოედანი, Berias moedani) and Lenin Square (Georgian: ლენინის მოედანი, Leninis moedani).

History

The square was originally named after Ivan Paskevich, Count of Erivan, a general in the Russian Imperial Army of Ukrainian descent, who earned his title in honor of his conquest of Erivan (present-day Yerevan) for the Russian Empire. During the Soviet era, the square was renamed twice: first to "Beria Square", and then "Lenin Square". The location was first named Freedom Square in 1918, during the foundation of the First Georgian Republic following the collapse of the Russian Empire.

The Freedom Square was the site of the 1907 Tiflis bank robbery. The Freedom Square has also been the site of various mass demonstrations including those for Georgia's independence (from the Soviet Union), the Rose Revolution, and others. In 2005 the Freedom Square was the location where U.S. President George W. Bush and Georgian President Mikheil Saakashvili addressed a crowd of around 100,000 people in celebration of the 60th anniversary marking the end of World War II. During this event, Georgian-Armenian Vladimir Arutyunian threw a live grenade at President Bush while he was speaking in an unsuccessful attempt to assassinate him.

Monuments
Abutting the north side of Freedom Square is a small open space with a fountain and a bust of Alexander Pushkin. Nearby the famous communist Kamo (Simon Ter-Petrossian) was once buried, but during Stalin's rule his remains were moved to an undisclosed location.

Tbilisi City Assembly is situated on the square. Other buildings include the former Bank of Georgia head office and the Courtyard by Marriott Tbilisi. The square will also accommodate the Old Tbilisi local government office, the building works of which are already started.

During the Soviet period, the square featured a large statue of Vladimir Lenin, which was built in 1956 and symbolically torn down in August 1991. On November 23, 2006, the Liberty Monument depicting St George slaying the dragon, created by Zurab Tsereteli was unveiled in the same place.

Branching out from this square are six streets: Rustaveli Avenue, Pushkin Street, Kote Apkhazi Street, Shalva Dadiani Street, Galaktion Tabidze Street and Giorgi Leonidze Street.

Gallery

References

Citation

Biography
 

Squares in Tbilisi
National squares
19th-century establishments in Georgia (country)
Caucasus Viceroyalty (1801–1917)